The Danger Signal, Canavan, the Man Who Had His Way or Caravan is a 1915 American drama silent black and white film directed by Walter Edwin and produced by George Kleine. It is based on the story of Rupert Hughes.

Cast
 Arthur Hoops as Danny Canavan / Dennis Canavan
 Ruby Hoffman as Beatrice Newnes
 John Davidson as Rodman Cadbury
 Frank Belcher as Boss Havens
 Tom Walsh as Roscoe Newnes
 Billy Sherwood as Henry Cadbury
 Della Connor as Amy Carroll
 Florence Coventry as Mrs. Canavan

References

External links
 

Silent American drama films
1915 drama films
1915 films
American black-and-white films
Films produced by George Kleine
Films based on works by Rupert Hughes
1910s American films